Ruby is a predominantly feminine given name taken from the name of the gemstone ruby. The name of the gemstone comes from the Latin rubinus, meaning red.   The ruby is the birthstone for the month of July. 

The name first came into wide use for girls in the late Victorian era along with other jewel names.

Popularity
Ruby is a currently well-used name for girls in English-speaking countries. The name was also once rarely given to boys in the United States and was ranked in the top 1,000 names given to boys born in that country between 1900 and 1940. In its masculine form, it is occasionally used as a nickname for the name Reuben.

Authors Pamela Redmond Satran and Linda Rosenkrantz noted in their 2007 book Baby Name Bible that Ruby is a "vibrant" name with a "sassy and sultry" image,
while Laura Wattenberg wrote in her 2005 book The Baby Name Wizard: A Magical Method for Finding the Perfect Name For Your Baby that Ruby has the image of a woman "kicking up her heels" at a music hall.

Notable people 
Notable people with the name include:

 Ruby Ashbourne Serkis (born 1998), English actress
 Ruby Barker (born 1996), British actress
 Ruby Bradley (1907–2002), Army nurse
 Ruby Bridges (born 1954), American activist, first African-American child to attend an all-white elementary school in Louisiana in the 20th century
 Ruby Dandridge (1900-1987), actress
 Ruby Dee (1924–2014), actress
 Ruby Dhalla (born 1974), Canadian politician
 Ruby Nash Garnett (born 1939), lead singer of American group Ruby & the Romantics
 Ruby Gilbert (1929-2010), American politician
 Ruby Goldstein ("Ruby the Jewel of the Ghetto"; 1907–84), American welterweight boxer and referee
 Ruby Berkley Goodwin (1903-1961), American writer and actress
 Ruby Hunter (1955–2010), Australian singer-songwriter
 Ruby Keeler (1909–1993), actress, singer and dancer
 Ruby Laffoon (1869–1941), 43rd Governor of Kentucky
 Ruby Lin (born 1976), Taiwanese actress
 Ruby McKim (1891–1976), English quilt designer, entrepreneur, and writer
 Ruby Modine (b. 1990), American actress and singer
 Ruby Murray (1935–1996), Northern Irish singer
 Ruby Myers (1907–1983), also known as Sulochana, Indian silent film actress
 Ruby Payne-Scott (1912–1981), pioneering Australian astronomer
 Ruby Rose (born 1986), Australian MTV VJ
 Ruby Riott (born 1991), ring name of American professional wrestler Dori Prange
 Ruby (born 1981), real name Rania Hussein Muhammad Tawfiq, Egyptian singer, actress and model
 Ruby Schleicher (born 1998), Australian rules footballer
 Ruby Svarc (born 1993), Australian rules footballer
 Ruby Turner (born 1958), British Jamaican singer, songwriter, and actress
 Ruby Walsh (born 1979), Irish jockey
 Ruby Wax (born 1953), comedian
 Ruby Winters (1942–2016), American soul singer
 Ruby Yang, Chinese-American filmmaker

Fictional characters
Ruby Allen, a character in the British soap opera EastEnders, played by Louisa Lytton
Ruby Anderson, a character in the animated series Rainbow High 
Ruby Baptiste, a character in the HBO television series Lovecraft Country
Ruby Dobbs, a character in the British soap opera Coronation Street
Ruby Gloom, the title character of the Canadian animated television series Ruby Gloom
Ruby Heart, original character in Marvel vs. Capcom 2
Ruby Kurosawa, a character from the media-mix project Love Live! Sunshine!!
Ruby Lucas, a character from the ABC show Once Upon a Time
Ruby Marshall, a character in the animated preschool television series Dot.
Ruby Moon, a character in Cardcaptor Sakura manga and anime
Ruby Crescent, a character of the 666 Satan manga
Ruby Rose, the main protagonist of the anime webseries RWBY
Ruby Roundhouse, a main character in the films Jumanji: Welcome to the Jungle and Jumanji: The Next Level
Ruby Spark, a character from the British drama Casualty
Ruby, an anthropomorphic rabbit and the main character in the Nick Jr. animated preschool series Max & Ruby 
Ruby, a character in the animated television series Steven Universe
Ruby, a character in the 2000s animated television series Trollz
Ruby, a character in the British animated preschool television series Small Potatoes
Ruby, a (male) character in the Pokémon Adventures manga series
Ruby, a demon character in the television series Supernatural
Ruby the Red Fairy, the first fairy in the Rainbow Magic book franchise
Ruby, a rabbit villager in the video game series Animal Crossing
Ruby Ramirez, a character in the animated preschool television series Rusty Rivets
Ruby, a young mutant in The Hills Have Eyes and The Hills Have Eyes (2006 film)

References

English feminine given names
English given names
Feminine given names
Given names derived from gemstones